The Wark is a river flowing through Luxembourg, joining the Alzette at Ettelbruck.  It flows through the towns of Mertzig, Feulen, Welscheid and Warken.

Rivers of the Ardennes (Luxembourg)
Rivers of Luxembourg
Rivers of Ettelbruck